The 2nd Light Cruiser Squadron was a naval formation of light cruisers of the Royal Navy from 1914 to 1925.

History

World War One
Originally part of the Grand Fleet, the squadron fought at the Battle of Jutland, where it was commanded by William Goodenough and consisted of Southampton (flagship), Birmingham, Nottingham and Dublin.

Following the battle, the squadron undertook patrol duties in the North Sea. Later in 1916, the Australian cruisers HMAS Melbourne and HMAS Sydney joined the squadron. It which saw action against German airships and light aircraft during 1917 and 1918.

The squadron was attached to Battle Cruiser Fleet from January 1915 until November 1916 when that formation was renamed Battle Cruiser Force it remained attached BC Force until February 1919. The Squadron was then disbanded for two months before reforming as part of the Home Fleet it was assigned to screening duties of the  Third Battle Squadron until July 1919. It remained attached to the Home Fleet until October 1919 when it was transferred to the Atlantic Fleet. In 1925 it was re-designated 2nd Cruiser Squadron.

Commodores/Rear-Admirals commanding
Post holders included:

Deployments
Distribution of the squadron included:

References

External links

Light Cruiser squadrons of the Royal Navy
Military units and formations of the Royal Navy in World War I